The Bayer designations a Puppis and A Puppis are distinct and refer to two different stars in the constellation Puppus:
a Puppis (HD 64440)
A Puppis (HD 54893)

See also
Puppis A, a supernova remnant in the constellation Puppis

Puppis, a
Puppis